Micronomicin (INN) is an aminoglycoside antibiotic for use on the eye.

References 

Aminoglycoside antibiotics